Morro de Areia Nature Reserve is a nature reserve covering the southwestern coast of the island of Boa Vista in Cape Verde. It takes its name from the hill Morro de Areia,  elevation. The natural reserve covers 21.31 km2 of land area, and stretches along the coast from the Praia de Chaves in the north to the Praia de Santa Monica in the south. The reserve includes a 300 m wide marine protection zone, an additional 4.36 km2.

Fauna
The nature reserve was established in order to protect the sand dynamics of the dunes, and endemic wildlife species including red-billed tropicbird, osprey, turtles, nurse shark, and numerous invertebrates.

See also
List of protected areas in Cape Verde

References

Areia
Geography of Boa Vista, Cape Verde
Protected areas of Cape Verde